Viorel Sima (born 30 April 1950) is a Romanian former football defender. He was part of UTA's team that in the 1970–1971 European Cup season eliminated Feyenoord who were European champions at that time.

Honours
UTA Arad
Divizia A: 1968–69, 1969–70

References

External links

Viorel Sima at Labtof.ro

1950 births
Living people
Romanian footballers
Association football defenders
Liga I players
Liga II players
FC UTA Arad players
People from Sebeș